Calliaster is a genus of starfish in the family Goniasteridae

Species list
Species in the genus include:

Calliaster acanthodes H.L. Clark, 1923
Calliaster baccatus Sladen, 1889
Calliaster childreni Gray, 1840
Calliaster corynetes Fisher, 1913
Calliaster elegans Doderlein, 1922
Calliaster erucaradiatus Livingstone, 1936
Calliaster mamillifer Alcock, 1893
Calliaster pedicellaris Fisher, 1906
Calliaster quadrispinus Liao, 1989
Calliaster regenerator Doderlein, 1922
Calliaster spinosus H.L. Clark, 1916
Calliaster thompsonae H.E.S. Clark, 2001

References

Goniasteridae